Albert of Austria may refer to:

 Albert I of Germany (1255–1308, r. 1298–1308), King of Germany and Duke of Austria
 Albert II, Duke of Austria (1298–1358)
 Albert III, Duke of Austria (1349–1395)
 Albert IV, Duke of Austria (1377–1404)
 Albert II of Germany (1397–1439), King of Germany, King of Hungary, Croatia and Bohemia, Duke of Austria as Albert V
 Albert VI, Archduke of Austria (1418–1463)
 Albert VII, Archduke of Austria (1559–1621), Governor of the Spanish Netherlands
 Archduke Albert, Duke of Teschen (1817–1895), Austrian General